Debra O’Connell Altschiller (born June 1, 1968) is an American politician serving as a member of the New Hampshire Senate She previously served in the New Hampshire House of Representatives for the Rockingham 19 district from 2016 to 2022.

Education 
Altschiller earned a Bachelor of Arts degree in communication and media studies from the University of Massachusetts Amherst.

Career 
From 2007 to 2013, Altschiller worked as a freelance blogger and content writer. From 2012 to 2015, she was the community relations coordinator for Sexual Assault Support Services. Since 2015, she has been the community relations event coordinator for HAVEN NH, a non-profit organization that provides services to victims of domestic violence. Altschiller was elected to the New Hampshire House of Representatives in 2016. She is the Democratic nominee for the 24th district of the New Hampshire Senate in the 2022 election.

References 

Living people
Democratic Party members of the New Hampshire House of Representatives
Women state legislators in New Hampshire
University of Massachusetts Amherst alumni
People from Stratham, New Hampshire
1968 births